Westbourne Academy is a secondary school with academy status located in Ipswich, Suffolk, England. It is a co-educational school for students aged 11–16 with post-16 provision accommodated at the Suffolk One sixth form centre. The principal is Bark Mouckley. The field used to be home of Ipswich Phoenix Football Club, and is now used by Ipswich Valley Rangers.

The school has been known by many different names since 1939, such as, Western Senior Girls' School, Westbourne School, Westbourne High School and Westbourne Sports College before becoming an academy in February 2013. It is now part of the Academy Transformation Trust.

Notable alumni
Kirk Degiorgio, techno producer and DJ.
Kieron Dyer, former Newcastle United, Ipswich Town and England midfielder.
Sean Hedges-Quinn, sculptor, animator and, film model and prop-maker.
Ian Payne, ITV Tyne Tees presenter.

References

Secondary schools in Suffolk
Academies in Suffolk
Schools in Ipswich
Whitehouse Ward, Ipswich